An outbreak of Elizabethkingia anophelis infections centered in Wisconsin  is thought to have led to the death of at least 20 people in Wisconsin, Michigan, and Illinois.

History
As of March 2016, it was reported to be the largest outbreak of Elizabethkingia anophelis-caused disease investigated by the Centers for Disease Control and Prevention (CDC).

Human infections by E. anophelis involve the bloodstream. Signs and symptoms can include fever, shortness of breath, chills, and cellulitis. Confirmation requires a laboratory test.

Statewide surveillance of the situation in Wisconsin was organized on January 5, 2016. Cases had been reported from Columbia, Dane, Dodge, Fond du Lac, Jefferson, Milwaukee, Ozaukee, Racine, Sauk, Sheboygan, Washington, Waukesha, and Winnebago Counties); Illinois; and western Michigan as of April 13, 2016.

Between November 1, 2015 and March 30, 2016, 62 cases of E. anophelis infections were reported to the Wisconsin Department of Health Services, Division of Public Health.

The severity of the outbreak is reflected in a statement by the CDC that "the agency sees a handful of Elizabethkingia infections around the country each year, but the outbreaks rarely involve more than a couple of cases at a time. To have dozens of cases at once — and more than a third of them possibly fatal — is startling".

References 

Disease outbreaks in the United States
2016 disasters in the United States
2016 in Wisconsin
2016 disease outbreaks
Health in Wisconsin
Disasters in Wisconsin